In molecular biology, the protein domain surE refers to survival protein E. It was originally found that cells that did not contain this protein, could not survive in the stationary phase, at above normal temperatures, and in high-salt media. Hence the name, survival protein E. It is a metal ion-dependent phosphatase that is found in bacteria, and eukaryotes. It is an important stress response protein. This domain is found in acid phosphatases (EC), 5'-nucleotidases (EC), 3'-nucleotidases (EC) and exopolyphosphatases (EC).

Interaction with pcm gene
The gene, surE, is part of a bicistronic operon  found upstream of  the pcm gene. When mutated, their phenotypes, or physical characteristics, are very similar and indicate that both gene products are important for survival under stressful conditions.

Function
The C-terminal domain is important mainly for maintaining the oligomeric state of the protein, SurE. The N-terminal domain is thought to be part of the  functional domain. Since the SurE is a phosphatase enzyme it removes a phosphate group from a substance, affecting that substance's role in signal transduction.

Structure
This protein consists of two protein domain. One is a large, globular N-terminal
domain and the other is a smaller C-terminal domain.

N-terminal domain
The N-terminal domain contains a three-layer alpha/beta/alpha sandwich that is homologous with the Rossmann fold (CATH class 3.40.50.170) of which the major feature is a long beta sheet that is composed of nine mostly parallel beta strands. SurEstructural domain has a similar topology to the N-terminal protein domain of the glutaminase/asparaginase family.

C-terminal domain
The C-terminal domain, has 3 beta strands  and  two  protrusions; one  of which is a C-terminal alpha helix, and the second is a beta hairpin.

References

Protein families
Bacterial proteins
Protein domains
Bacterial enzymes